Ytre Tasta is a neighborhood (delområde) in the city of Stavanger which lies in the southwestern part of the large municipality of Stavanger in Rogaland county, Norway. It is located in the northern part of the mainland borough of Tasta. The Indre Tasta neighborhood lies to the south, the Gandsfjorden is to the east, and the municipality of Randaberg is to the north and west. Vardeneset Church is located in this neighborhood.

References

Boroughs and neighbourhoods of Stavanger